Trichagrotis was a genus of moths of the family Noctuidae, it is now considered a synonym of Hypotrix.

Species
 Trichagrotis spinosa (Barnes & McDunnough, 1912)

References
Natural History Museum Lepidoptera genus database
Trichagrotis at funet

Hadeninae